George Dunton Widener (June 16, 1861 – April 15, 1912) was an American businessman who died in the sinking of the RMS Titanic.

Early life
Widener was born in Philadelphia on June 16, 1861.  He was the eldest son of Hannah Josephine Dunton (1836–1896) and Peter Arrell Brown Widener (1834–1915), an extremely wealthy streetcar magnate.

Career
He joined his father's business and eventually took over the running of the Philadelphia Traction Company, overseeing the development of cable and electric streetcar operations. He also served on the board of directors of several important area businesses, including Philadelphia Traction Co., Land Title Bank and Trust Co., Electric Storage Battery Co., and Portland Cement Co. A patron of the arts, Widener was a director of the Pennsylvania Academy of Fine Arts.

RMS Titanic
In 1912, Widener, his wife, and their son Harry traveled to Paris, France, with original intentions to find a chef for Widener's new Philadelphia hotel, The Ritz Carlton. The Wideners booked their return passage on RMS Titanic. After the ship struck an iceberg, Widener placed his wife and her maid Amalie Gieger in a lifeboat. The women were rescued by the steamship RMS Carpathia, but Widener and his son Harry and their valet Edwin Keeping perished on the Titanic. The bodies of the father and son, if recovered, were not identified.

Personal life
In 1883, he married Eleanor Elkins, the daughter of his father's business partner, William Lukens Elkins. Together, they had two sons and a daughter:

 Harry Elkins Widener (1885–1912), who died aboard the Titanic.
 George Dunton Widener Jr. (1889–1971), who married Jessie Sloane Dodge (1883–1968) in 1917.
 Eleanor Widener (1891–1966), who married Fitz Eugene Dixon on June 19, 1912. Eleanor sued Dixon for divorce in 1936.

After Widener and his son's death aboard the Titanic, a memorial service was held at St. Paul's Episcopal Church in Elkins Park, Pennsylvania, where stained glass windows were dedicated in their memory.

Descendants
He was the maternal grandfather of Fitz Eugene Dixon Jr. (1923–2006). Dixon, who lived in Philadelphia, owned the Philadelphia 76ers and was a part owner of the Eagles, the Phillies and the Flyers.

Residence
Widener had commissioned Horace Trumbauer to design and oversee construction of Miramar, a  French neoclassical-style mansion bordering Bellevue Avenue on Aquidneck Island at Newport, Rhode Island. Intended as a summer home, it was still in the design stage at the time of his death.

In popular culture
Widener was played by Guy Standing, Jr. in the film Titanic (1953).

See also
Widener Gold Medal

References

Sources

 Mr George Dunton Widener, Encyclopedia Titanica
 Titanic: Triumph and Tragedy, by John P. Eaton and Charles A. Haas, W.W. Newton & Company, 2nd edition 1995 
 A Night to Remember, by Walter Lord, ed. Nathaniel Hilbreck, Owl Books, rep. 2004, 

1861 births
1912 deaths
American transportation businesspeople
Businesspeople from Philadelphia
Deaths by drowning
People associated with the Pennsylvania Academy of the Fine Arts
People associated with the Philadelphia Museum of Art
People from Cheltenham, Pennsylvania
People from Montgomery County, Pennsylvania
Deaths on the RMS Titanic
Widener family